Bolt Thrower were an English death metal band from Coventry. They formed in 1986 and released their first album with Vinyl Solution in 1988. The band then shifted to a new record label, Earache Records, soon becoming one of the best selling bands on that label. Their last label was Metal Blade Records. The band had a succession of members, and had toured Europe, the United States, and Australia. Over the course of their 30-year career, Bolt Thrower released eight studio albums, three EPs, one live album, three compilation albums and two demos. On 14 September 2016 the band announced that they were breaking up, following the death of drummer Martin Kearns exactly a year earlier.

History

Early history (1986–1988)
Bolt Thrower were formed in September 1986 as a grindcore band, influenced largely by bands such as Slayer, Crass and Discharge. The band was founded by bassist Gavin Ward and guitarist Barry Thomson in a Coventry pub toilet during a hardcore punk gig. Shortly thereafter Andrew Whale and Alan West joined on drums and vocals respectively. In April 1987 the In Battle There Is No Law demo was recorded with this line-up.

Their second recording was the Concession of Pain demo, which they made in September 1987. Gavin had switched to guitars and they recruited Alex Tweedy to play the bass. However, Alex did not show up for the recording, and so Gavin played both guitar and bass for the demo. Two weeks after the recording session, Gavin's girlfriend Jo Bench replaced Tweedy.

With this line-up they recorded their first Peel session on 3 January 1988, with John Peel, the alternative disk jockey of BBC Radio One. He had received their second demo and became enthusiastic about the band. They recorded four tracks for it, resulting in a deal with Vinyl Solution to release one album. Just before the recording of their first full-length album, they replaced their singer with their driver Karl Willetts. Their debut LP, In Battle There Is No Law is only a half hour in length and has a primitive and raw sound often categorized as grindcore.

Rise to popularity and departures of Karl Willetts and Andy Whale (1989–1994)

They were not satisfied with the deal with Vinyl Solution as it was a pure hardcore label at that time. The label did little promotion for Bolt Thrower and their blend of death metal and hardcore punk, so after one album Bolt Thrower decided to leave Vinyl Solution and were signed by Earache Records. Earache Records had also signed many other death metal bands including Carcass and Napalm Death. The artwork for their second album was created by John Sibbick under contract for Games Workshop for the Warhammer 40,000 rulebook released in 1987. After Games Workshop heard the recording of the songs for Bolt Thrower's second Peel session, which was recorded on 6 November 1988, they offered to supply the artwork for Bolt Thrower's album, an offer the band quickly accepted. The record was released in 1989, titled Realm of Chaos: Slaves to Darkness, after the 1988 book of the same name published by Games Workshop. Most of the lyrics to the songs were also influenced by the game, but not merely because of the deal with Games Workshop. Karl, Andy and Gavin were very much into the games Games Workshop produced and they wrote a couple of songs about these games, including "Plague Bearer" and "World Eater". After the recording of Realm of Chaos, they went on the 'Grindcrusher Tour' with labelmates Napalm Death, Carcass and Morbid Angel. On the Cenotaph EP one song ("Realm of Chaos") appears that is recorded during this tour. This EP also features the two CD-bonus tracks from War Master and Realm of Chaos plus the song "Cenotaph".

Continuing, they recorded their third and final Peel session on 22 July 1990. On these three songs from the upcoming album were performed in raw versions as well as "Lost Souls Domain" off Realm of Chaos. The next step in the history of Bolt Thrower was the album titled War Master. It was recorded, as was the previous album, in Slaughterhouse Studios, which burnt down two weeks after the recordings were completed. Again, Games Workshop offered to do their artwork; however, as it was considered too expensive, Bolt Thrower declined the offer. The former head designer of Games Workshop would do the artwork, resulting in artwork quite similar to Realm of Chaos. During the US tour they went on to promote the War Master album, they used an old US school bus as a tour bus, loaded with many computer games. All three Peel sessions were then released on one CD named The Peel Sessions 1988–90 in 1991.

Their next step was the album The IVth Crusade. The title has a double meaning, as it was their fourth studio album (not counting the Peel sessions), but the album title also refers to the Fourth Crusade and the capturing of Constantinople. The cover artwork is a painting from Eugène Delacroix, showing "The Entry of the Crusaders in Constantinople".

They wrote slower songs which were heavier and more bombastic. It leans more towards doom metal influenced by bands like Candlemass, in combination with their own massive death metal sound. The album was followed by the tour 'World Crusade' with the Polish death metal act Vader and the Swedish death metal band Grave in Europe. The band toured the US again as well as Australia. During this time, a single was released called "Spearhead", containing a very heavy, extended remix of the CD track "Spearhead", plus two new tracks and "Dying Creed" off the new album.

Their next album is called ...For Victory and was released in 1994. It was the final album with Karl Willetts and Andrew Whale. Both left the band because of changing life directions. The latest American tour did not go well, they returned home prematurely and by this time the band was quite fed-up with touring. A limited edition of the album exists containing a bonus live CD, called War (sometimes called Live War). After the album released, Karl Willetts was replaced by former Pestilence singer Martin van Drunen, and Martin "Kiddie" Kearns, who took over the drum kit.

More lineup changes, Mercenary and Honour – Valour – Pride (1995–2003)
In 1995 and 1996 they went on two European tours. In 1997, Martin van Drunen decided to leave the band as he felt that he never really became a part of Bolt Thrower, and because he had a disease that made his hair fall out and gave him insecurity on stage. For at least one show in Germany, long time friend Dave Ingram stood in. Martin Kearns also decided to leave the band. The position at the drum kit is now taken by Alex Thomas. Karl Willetts temporarily rejoined the band to do vocal duties on their next album. The band switched record labels from Earache to Metal Blade Records, because since the US ...For Victory tour they had seen a lack of success with Earache. Earache had also wanted to get rid of them and Bolt Thrower wanted to leave Earache as soon as possible, so they parted company.

The album titled Mercenary was released on 8 September 1998 in Europe and on 10 November 1998 in the US and features nine tracks. It is an overall slower album than its predecessors. However, it is definitely very heavy and sounds very much like classic Bolt Thrower. Karl also returned to performing his previous style of singing; the hardcore punk influences have disappeared again. After the album recording, Karl left the band again and the band recruited Dave Ingram permanently after he left Benediction.

In November 1998, Earache Records released Who Dares Wins, a compilation featuring various older recordings, including the Spearhead and Cenotaph EPs. The band members themselves do not approve of the compilation's release and warn not to buy it, considering it a cheap cash-in from Earache. Originally, it was titled No Guts - No Glory but the title was changed because one song on Mercenary has the same title and Metal Blade Records objected. Following the release of Mercenary, the band embarked on a tour of Europe, called Into the Killing Zone, with Dave Ingram on vocals. Alex Thomas departed since he lacked interest in the musical direction of Bolt Thrower.

After a short European tour in 2001 (which only consisted of 5 dates), they started to work on a new album. Honour - Valour - Pride was released in 2001 on Metal Blade Records, and shows a progression from the direction taken on Mercenary. It contains nine tracks; the digipak includes one bonus track. Martin Kearns returned to the band after he settled his things in his life.

Reunion with Karl Willetts and Those Once Loyal (2004–2014)
In 2004, the band began working on new material for their latest album. They intended to record it in May 2004, with the release set to the end of the year by Metal Blade. Meanwhile, a European tour and a US tour were being prepared. Unfortunately, right before the recording could begin, Dave Ingram decided to leave due to health and personal issues. This postponed the new record and tours, and priority was set to finding a new singer. On 18 November 2004 the band announced the return of Karl Willetts. Recording of the album, titled Those Once Loyal, started in May 2005; it was released on 11 November in Germany, 14 November in the rest of Europe and 15 November in the United States, 2005. It has been met with widespread critical acclaim from magazines such as Rock Sound, Rock Hard and Metal Hammer. A European tour followed in January and February 2006. A second leg followed in April, with dates in Scandinavia, the UK, Spain and more.

Bolt Thrower announced that, as they were satisfied with the Those Once Loyal album, they would be indefinitely postponing the recording of another LP. The band stated that their goal was always to stop after releasing "the perfect Bolt Thrower album". However, Karl Willetts had mentioned work on a ninth album.

Since releasing Those Once Loyal, Earache has released a remastered edition of the 1989 album Realm of Chaos featuring alternate artwork by John Sibbick, the artist responsible for the original artwork of both the Warhammer 40,000 Rogue Trader cover and Realm of Chaos - Slaves to Darkness. The band encouraged people not to buy it as, like Who Dares Wins, it was released without their consultation let alone consent. Furthermore, it has been alleged that the band has not received royalties from Earache for a number of years.

Death of Martin Kearns and the end of Bolt Thrower (2015–2016)
Martin Kearns, who had been Bolt Thower's drummer from 1994 to 1997 and again since 2000, died unexpectedly at the age of 38 on 14 September 2015. As a result of his death, Bolt Thrower went on hiatus and cancelled their upcoming Australian tour, which would have been their first since 1993.

On 14 September 2016, the first anniversary of Kearns' death, Bolt Thrower announced on their website that they would not continue, explaining, "We spent over 20 years together, touring the world, with 3 different vocalists, but he was so much more than just a drummer to us. So when we carried his coffin to his final resting place, the Bolt Thrower drummer position was buried with him. He was, and will now forever remain THE Bolt Thrower drummer, our Powerhouse and friend Martin 'Kiddie' Kearns." Rumours of the band's break-up were confirmed two days later by frontman Karl Willetts, stating, "I can confirm that Bolt Thrower are definitely over for good. There will be no reunion tours etc... no compromise."

Aftermath and reunion rumours (2017–present)
On 7 March 2017, which would have been Kearns' 40th birthday, Bolt Thrower posted a lengthy statement on their website, which suggested that a reunion or possible new release in memory of him was in the works. As of 2022, nothing has come of this.

Members

Final lineup
 Barry "Baz" Thomson – guitars (1986–2016)
 Gavin Ward – guitars (1987–2016), bass (1986–1987)
 Jo Bench – bass guitar (1987–2016)
 Karl Willetts – vocals (1987–1994, 1997–1998, 2004–2016)
 Martin Kearns – drums (1994–1997, 1999–2015; died 2015)

Former members
 Alex Thomas – drums (1997–1999)
 Andrew Whale – drums (1986–1994)
 Alan West – vocals (1986–1987)
 Alex Tweedy – bass (1987)
 Martin van Drunen – vocals (1994–1997)
 Dave Ingram – vocals (1998–2004)

Timeline

Discography

Studio albums
In Battle There Is No Law! (1988)
Realm of Chaos: Slaves to Darkness (1989) 
War Master (1991)
The IVth Crusade (1992)
...For Victory (1994)
Mercenary (1998)
Honour – Valour – Pride (2001)
Those Once Loyal (2005)

Extended plays
The Peel Session (1988)
Cenotaph (1991)
Spearhead (1993)

Live albums
War (2010)

Compilation albums
The Peel Sessions 1988–90 (1991)
Who Dares Wins (1998)
The Best of Bolt Thrower (2016)

Demos
In Battle There Is No Law (self-released cassette, 1987)
Concession of Pain (self-released cassette, 1987)
Forgotten Existence (self-released cassette,  1988)
Prophets of Hell (self-released cassette, 1988)

Video clips
Cenotaph (1991)
The IVth Crusade (1992)
...For Victory (1998)
Inside the Wire (2000)

Tours

References

External links
 Bolt Thrower page @ Metal Blade
 Official Bolt Thrower website
 Extensive Bolt Thrower FAQ
 Bolt Thrower on Discogs
 Bolt Thrower on the Metal Archives

Audio files (mp3) 
Mercenary (1997)
8. "No Guts, No Glory"
Honour – Valour – Pride (2001)
1. "Contact - Wait Out"
Those Once Loyal (2005)
5. "Those Once Loyal"

English death metal musical groups
Musical groups from Coventry
Musical groups established in 1986
Earache Records artists
Musical quintets
1986 establishments in England
Musical groups disestablished in 2016
2016 disestablishments in England
Metal Blade Records artists